PNY or pny may refer to:
 PNY Technologies, an American manufacturer of computer components
 PNY, an alternative name of Beta-amyrin synthase, an enzyme
 PNY, the IATA airport code for the Pondicherry Airport
 pny, the ISO 639-3 code for the Pinyin language